Roger Anciaux (born 30 October 1919) was a Belgian sailor. He competed in the Dragon event at the 1948 Summer Olympics.

References

External links
 

1919 births
Possibly living people
Belgian male sailors (sport)
Olympic sailors of Belgium
Sailors at the 1948 Summer Olympics – Dragon
Sportspeople from Brussels